is a railway station in Sumida, Tokyo, Japan. Its station number is S-12. The station opened on December 21, 1978.

Platforms
Kikukawa Station consists of a single island platform served by two tracks.

Surrounding area
The station is located underneath the intersection of Tokyo Metropolitan Routes 319 (Mitsume-dōri) and 50 (Shin-Ōhashi-dōri). The area is typically shitamachi with a mix of commercial, residential, and light industrial buildings.

Connecting bus services
 Toei Bus (Kikukawa-Ekimae stop)

Line
 Tokyo Metropolitan Bureau of Transportation - Toei Shinjuku Line

References

External links

 Tokyo Metropolitan Bureau of Transportation: Kikukawa Station 

Railway stations in Japan opened in 1978
Railway stations in Tokyo